Leslie "Les" Pearson (birth unknown – death unknown) was a professional rugby league footballer who played in the 1930s.

Playing career

Les Diables Rouges
Les Pearson was one of the players who successfully toured in France with Salford in 1934, during which the Salford team earned the name "Les Diables Rouges", the seventeen players were; Joe Bradbury, Bob Brown, Aubrey Casewell, Paddy Dalton, Bert Day, Cliff Evans, Jack Feetham, George Harris, Barney Hudson, Emlyn Jenkins, Alf Middleton, Sammy Miller, Harold Osbaldestin, Les Pearson, Gus Risman, Billy Watkins and Billy Williams.

Championship final appearances
Les Pearson played , i.e. number 2, in Salford's 3–15 defeat by Wigan in the Championship Final during the 1933–34 season at Wilderspool, Warrington on Saturday 28 April 1934.

County Cup Final appearances
About Les Pearson's time, there was Salford's 2-15 defeat by Warrington in the 1929 Lancashire County Cup Final during the 1929–30 season at Central Park, Wigan on Saturday 23 November 1929, the 10-8 victory over Swinton in the 1931 Lancashire County Cup Final during the 1931–32 season at the Cliff, Broughton, Salford on Saturday 21 November 1931, the 21-12 victory over Wigan in the 1934 Lancashire County Cup Final during the 1934–35 season at Station Road, Swinton on Saturday 20 October 1934, the 15-7 victory over Wigan in the 1935 Lancashire County Cup Final during the 1935–36 season at Wilderspool, Warrington on Saturday 19 October 1935, the 5-2 victory over Wigan in the 1936 Lancashire County Cup Final during the 1936–37 season at Wilderspool, Warrington on Saturday 17 October 1936, and the 7-10 defeat by Wigan in the 1938 Lancashire County Cup Final during the 1938–39 season at Station Road, Swinton on Saturday 22 October 1938.

References

External links
Search for "Pearson" at rugbyleagueproject.org

English rugby league players
Oldham R.L.F.C. players
Place of birth missing
Rugby league wingers
Salford Red Devils players
Year of birth missing
Year of death missing